Frances E. Lee, an American political scientist, is currently a professor of politics and public affairs at the Princeton School of Public and International Affairs at Princeton University. She previously taught at Case Western Reserve University and the University of Maryland, College Park. Lee specializes in American politics focusing on the U.S. Congress. From 2014 to 2019, Lee was co-editor of Legislative Studies Quarterly and is the first editor of Cambridge University Press's American Politics Elements Series. Her 2009 book Beyond Ideology has been cited over 600 times in the political science literature. Lee is also a co-author of the seminal textbook Congress and Its Members, currently in its eighteenth edition.

Lee graduated with honors from the University of Southern Mississippi with a B.A. in English in 1991. In 1997, she completed her PhD in political science at Vanderbilt University. Her doctoral dissertation, "The enduring consequences of the Great Compromise: Senate apportionment and congressional policymaking," was supervised by Bruce I. Oppenheimer.

Awards
E. E. Schattschneider Award from the American Political Science Association (1997)
D.B. Hardeman Prize from the Lyndon Baines Johnson Foundation (1999 and 2009)
Richard F. Fenno Award from the American Political Science Association (2009)
 Member of the American Academy of Arts and Sciences, elected 2019
Gladys M. Kammerer Award from the American Political Science Association (2021) (with James M. Curry)

Selected works

Books
Frances E. Lee and Bruce I. Oppenheimer. 1999. Sizing Up the Senate: The Unequal Consequences of Equal Representation. Chicago: University of Chicago Press.
Frances E. Lee. 2009. Beyond Ideology: Politics, Principles and Partisanship in the U.S. Senate. Chicago: University of Chicago Press.
Eric Schickler and Frances E. Lee, eds. 2011. The Oxford Handbook of the American Congress. New York: Oxford University Press. Selected by Choice, the American Library Association's reviews publication, as one of its top 25 outstanding academic titles for 2012. Part of the Oxford Handbooks of Political Science series
Frances E. Lee 2016. Insecure Majorities: Congress and the Perpetual Campaign. Chicago: University of Chicago Press.
Frances E. Lee and Nolan McCarty, eds. 2019. Can America Govern Itself? New York: Cambridge University Press.
James M. Curry and Frances E. Lee. 2020. The Limits of Party: Congress and Lawmaking in a Polarized Era. Chicago: University of Chicago Press.
Roger H. Davidson, Walter J. Oleszek, Frances E. Lee, Eric Schickler, and James M. Curry. 2021. Congress and Its Members, 18th ed. Thousand Oaks: Sage.

Other publications
Frances E. Lee. 2000.“Senate Representation and Coalition Building in Distributive Politics,” American Political Science Review, 94 (March) 59–72.
Frances E. Lee. 2003. "Geographic Politics in the U.S. House of Representatives: Coalition Building and Distribution of Benefits,” American Journal of Political Science 47 (November): 713–727. September 2018, p. 3
Frances E. Lee. 2004. "Bicameral Institutions and Geographic Politics: Allocating Federal Funds for Transportation in the House and Senate,” Legislative Studies Quarterly 24 (May): 185–214.
Frances E. Lee. 2008. "Agreeing to Disagree: Agenda Content and Senate Partisanship, 1981–2004.” Legislative Studies Quarterly 33 (May): 199–222.
Frances E. Lee. 2008. "Dividers, Not Uniters: Presidential Leadership and Senate Partisanship, 1981–2004” Journal of Politics 70 (October): 914–928.
Frances E. Lee. 2013. "Presidents and Party Teams: The Politics of Debt Limits and Executive Oversight, 2001–2013,” Presidential Studies Quarterly 43 (4): 775–791.
Frances E. Lee. 2015. “How Party Polarization Affects Governance,” Annual Review of Political Science 18 (June): 261–282.
Frances E. Lee. 2016. “Patronage, Logrolls, and Polarization: Congressional Parties of the Gilded Age, 1876–1896.” Studies in American Political Development 30: 116–127. 
Frances E. Lee. 2018. “The 115th Congress and Questions of Party Unity in a Polarized Era.” Journal of Politics.

Editorial service
As Editor
Legislative Studies Quarterly (Co-editor) (2014–2019)
Elements Series in American Politics, Cambridge University Press (2017–present)

Editorial boards
American Journal of Political Science (2014–2018) 
American Politics Research (2007–present) 
Congress & the Presidency (2007–present)
Journal of Politics (2007–2009, 2013–2015)
Legislative Studies Quarterly (2005–2010)

Media
Interview with Ezra Klein of Vox Media about gridlock.
Ezra Klein Show, "Why bipartisanship is irrational."
Interview on C-SPAN discussing majoritarian rule in the Senate.
Frances E. Lee. "Repeal-and-Replace Is Probably Doomed. Congress Rarely Works Along Party Lines," The Washington Post, July 21, 2017.
James M. Curry and Frances E. Lee. "A Senate Majority is Overrated. (We Checked.)," The New York Times, November 18, 2020.
Frances E. Lee and James M. Curry. "What’s Really Holding the Democrats Back," The Atlantic, April 23, 2021.
James M. Curry and Frances E. Lee. "There’s a Curse in Washington, and the Party in Control Can’t Seem to Shake It," The New York Times, October 13, 2021.
Interview on New Books in Political Science Podcast, October 6, 2021.

References

Further reading

Washington Monthly

American women political scientists
American political scientists
Vanderbilt University alumni
University of Maryland, College Park faculty
Living people
Year of birth missing (living people)
Historians of the United States Congress
Fellows of the American Academy of Arts and Sciences
Political science journal editors
Princeton University faculty
Case Western Reserve University faculty
American women academics